There are 242 named lakes in Marinette County, Wisconsin, along with 200 with no names. Together they make up 13,735 acres of surface area. Noquebay Lake, at 2,409 acres, is the largest.

Named lakes are listed below. Alternate names are indicated in parentheses.

See also 

 List of lakes in Wisconsin

References

Lakes
Lakes in Marinette County